Tunø Knob Offshore Wind Farm is an offshore wind farm in the Bay of Aarhus, Denmark. It is located on the sandbar Tunø Knob, west of the Tunø island. 

The wind farm was commissioned in 1995 with 10 turbines, each a 500 kW Vestas V39. The turbines are 45 metres high, based on concrete foundations at 3-6 meter deep waters, and together they produce enough electricity to supply c. 2,800 households. The Tunø Knob Offshore Wind Farm was the first offshore wind farm by Danish wind turbine company Vestas.

See also

Wind power in Denmark
List of offshore wind farms in Denmark

References

External links 

Wind farms in Denmark
Ørsted (company) wind farms
Energy infrastructure completed in 1995
1995 establishments in Denmark